Thane was the title given to a local royal official in medieval eastern Scotland, equivalent in rank to the son of an earl, who was at the head of an administrative and socio-economic unit known as a thanedom.

History

The earliest documentary record of a thane is in the written judgement of a land dispute settled at a provincial assembly of Fife between 1128 and 1136, at which one attendee is described as the thane of Falkland. A further eleven thanes are recorded over the course of the rest of the 12th century, attached to estates from East Lothian to Moray, all of which were at the time under the control of the King of Alba. From around the beginning of the 13th century a few thanes also start to be documented attached to estates under the control of earls, including Dunning and Strowan, which both lay within the Earldom of Strathearn. A statute of 1221 explicitly allowed that some thanes could be responsible to an earl rather than the king, though the overwhelming majority of thanes in the historical record were attached to lands that lay outside earldoms and were in royal hands.

The thane was introduced in the reign of David I (reigned 1124–1153), an Anglophile, to replace the Gaelic tòiseach (meaning leader, and with which the term Taoiseach shares an origin). In Scotland at that time toshach designated a deputy to a mormaer, controlling a particular portion of a mormaerdom on the mormaer's behalf. The English thegn was a more general term, simply referring to landholders of widely varying importance. Having introduced earl to describe mormaers, David used thane to describe toshachs.

Functionally, the thane was a territorial administrator, acting under a territorial earl (the latter resembling a Saxon ealdorman rather than the more superficial Norman earl), or royal steward. 12th century evidence makes it clear that the thane's key role was to collect revenue and services from the estates they administered, being permitted to keep some for themselves as "thane's right".  Though thanes often held land within the region they administered, this was coincidental; providing land tenure was simply the way of paying for their services, the location of their lands not being intrinsically linked to the authority they wielded in any particular region.

However, after the death of Alexander III in 1286, thanes differed from their tosach forebears by holding their position as a feudal grant from the crown, rather than the almost independent status held by a tosach. Thanes consequently resembled English barons, but with greater judicial and administrative authority which extended beyond the lands they directly held. In later centuries, the term thanes dropped out of use in favour of baron, but described as having regality, a term used to describe both the thanes' powers, and the greater powers of the territorial earl.

List of thanages

Aberdeen
Formartine
Belhelvie
Kintore
Aberdeen
Kincardine O'Neil
Aboyne
Angus
Kinnaber
Menmuir
Clova
Kinalty
Tannadice
Aberlermo
Old Montrose
Inverkeilor
Idvies
Forfar
Glamis
Downie
Monifieth
Banff
Boyne
Mumbrie
Netherdale
Aberchirder
Conveth	
Glendowachy
East Lothian
Haddington
Fife
Falkland
Kingskettle
Dairsie
Kellie
Inverness
Kinmylies
Essich
Kincardine
Dingwall
Durris
Cowie
Uras
Arbuthnott
Kincardine
Fettercairn
Newdosk
Aberluthnott
Laurencekirk
Morphie
Kinross
Kinross
Moray
Brodie
Dyke
Cromdale
Kilmalemnock
Rathnech
Fochabers
Molen
Nairn
Cawdor
Moynes
Perth
Alyth
Strathardle
Coupar Angus
Longforgan
Scone
Kinclaven
Glentilt
Dull
Fortingall
Crannach
Findowie
Dalmarnock
Strowan
Auchterarder
Dunning
Forteviot
Ross & Cromarty
Dingwall
Stirling
Callendar

Cultural associations
In William Shakespeare's Macbeth (1606), the character Macbeth holds the title "Thane of Glamis", and later, "Thane of Cawdor".
The historical King Macbeth fought a Thane of Cawdor who died in battle, but he did not thereby acquire the title himself.

The 2nd Earl of Cawdor wrote a history of the Thanes of Cawdor, in 1742, published in 1859.

In the video game The Elder Scrolls V: Skyrim, the player character is able to receive the honorary title of Thane of Whiterun (and other "holds") by completing quests for the local Jarl. The title allows the player to purchase land within various holds, such as Whiterun or Falkreath.

See also
 Abthain
 Thane of Calder
 Thane of Cawdor
 Thane of Fife
 Thane of Lochaber
 Thegn

References

Bibliography
 
 

12th-century establishments in Scotland
Politics in medieval Scotland
Scottish titles